Pontic, from the Greek pontos, or "sea", may refer to:

The Black Sea

Places
 The Pontic colonies, on its northern shores
 Pontus (region), a region on its southern shores
 The Pontic–Caspian steppe, steppelands stretching from north of the Black Sea as far east as the Caspian Sea
 The Pontic Mountains, a range of mountains in northern Turkey, close to the southern coast of the Black Sea

Languages and peoples
 Pontic Greeks, all Greek peoples from the shores of the Black Sea and Pontus
 Pontic Greek, a form of the Greek language originally spoken by the Pontic Greeks (see above)
 Pontic, as opposed to Caspian (which refers to the possibly related Nakho-Dagestanian or Northeast Caucasian languages), is sometimes used as a synonym for the Northwest Caucasian language family.
 Pontic languages, the hypothetical language family linking the Northwest Caucasian and Indo-European languages, and Proto-Pontic, the Pontic proto-language, is the reconstructed common ancestor of Proto-Northwest Caucasian and Proto-Indo-European.

Other uses
Pontic, a false tooth used within a dental bridge
 Pontic, formerly known as Mutual FC, a Hong Kong Second Division League association football team

See also
Pontiac (disambiguation)
Pontian (disambiguation)
Pontus (disambiguation)

Language and nationality disambiguation pages